Wrigley's Food Creatures are little cute characters that appear in Wrigley's Orbit, Extra, Freedent and Excel advertisements.

The advertising campaign started in 2007.

List
Here is a list of all of the 24 Food Creatures : 
 Doughnut
 Garlic
 Onion
 Coffee
 Cigarette
 Banana
 Pizza
 Cookie
 Soft Drink
 Pop-Corn
 Chocolate
 Raspberry
 Sushi
 Sandwich
 Chip Bag
 Wine
 Toast
 Tea
 Salsa
 Cereal Box
 Broccoli
 Chicken Leg
 Pepper
 Sausage

References 

 http://extragum.com.au/home

Advertising characters